TEZ may refer to:
 Aaj Tak, a Hindi news television channel
 Tez TV, Hindi news television channel 
 Tez (software), a payments app by Google
 Tatra Electric Railway, a railway in Slovakia
 TEZ Tour, a Russian tour operator
 Tezpur Airport, Tezpur, Assam, India
 Total Exclusion Zone, an area designated by the United Kingdom during the Falklands War surrounding the Falkland Islands